In Germany, the President of the Bundesrat or President of the Federal Council (German: Bundesratspräsident) is the chairperson (speaker) of the Bundesrat (Federal Council). The president is elected by the Bundesrat for a term of one year (usually from November 1 to October 31 in the next year). Traditionally, the presidency of the Bundesrat rotates among the leaders of the sixteen state governments. This is however only an established practice; theoretically the Bundesrat is free to elect any member it chooses, and a president could also be re-elected (which has happened once, in 1957). As well as acting as a chairperson, the president of the Bundesrat is ex officio deputy of the Federal President. The President of the German Federal Council is 4th in the German order of precedence. In addition, the main celebration of German Unity Day is traditionally held in the state that holds the presidency.

The president of the Bundesrat convenes and chairs plenary sessions of the body and is formally responsible for representing the Federal Republic in the Bundesrat. The president is aided by two vice presidents who play an advisory role and deputise in the president's absence. The three together constitute the presidium of the Bundesrat.

The current president of the Bundesrat is Peter Tschentscher, the First Mayor of Hamburg, whose one-year term started on 1 November 2022.

Election
The Basic Law provides that "the Bundesrat elects its President for one year" (Art. 52.1). In order to be elected, a nominee needs a majority of votes in the Bundesrat (currently 35 of 69).

In practice the position rotates among the states equally, following a constitutional convention known as the “Königstein agreement” (Königsteiner Vereinbarung). The position rotates from one state to another in an order determined by population, the presidency descending from the most populous state to the least. The order is updated based on the newest census-data everytime a rotation has been completed.

The Königsstein agreement also states that, if the sitting President of the Bundesrat exits his office as Minister-President, by losing a state election, resignation, or death, the new Minister-President of that state is elected President of the Bundesrat subsequently, but only to complete their predecessors term. The last time this occurred was in April 1999, when Hans Eichel, President of the Bundesrat and Minister-President of Hesse, had lost the 1999 Hesse state election and his successor Roland Koch served the end of his term until October 1999. The current order of rotation of the presidency of the Bundesrat is as follows:

North Rhine-Westphalia
Bavaria
Baden-Württemberg
Lower Saxony
Hesse
Saxony
Rhineland-Palatinate
Berlin
Schleswig-Holstein
Brandenburg
Saxony-Anhalt
Thuringia
Hamburg
Mecklenburg-Vorpommern
Saarland
Bremen

Deputy to the Federal President
Article 57 of the Basic Law provides that:

If the Federal President is unable to perform his duties, or if his office falls prematurely vacant, the President of the Bundesrat shall exercise his powers.

If the office of the Federal President falls vacant, the President of the Bundesrat fills in as acting President. While doing so, they do not continue to exercise the role of chair of the Bundesrat.  If the president resigns, dies, or is removed from office, a successor is elected within thirty days.

Three Presidents of the Bundesrat have served as acting Presidents:
 Karl Arnold (from 7 September 1949 to 12 September 1949 after he was elected as President of the Bundesrat and before Theodor Heuss was elected as the first President of Germany. With a tenure of only six days he is yet the shortest serving head of state in German history)
 Jens Böhrnsen (from 31 May 2010 to 30 June 2010 after the resignation of Horst Köhler and before the election of Christian Wulff)
 Horst Seehofer (from 17 February 2012 to 18 March 2012 after the resignation of Christian Wulff and before the election of Joachim Gauck)
If the Federal President is abroad on a state visit the President of the Bundesrat does not assume all of the Federal President's responsibilities but may "deputise" for him or her, performing on the Federal President's behalf merely those tasks that require his or her physical presence, such as the signing of documents.

List of presidents
 Political Party

|-
| style="text-align:center;" bgcolor=#EEEEEE colspan= 8| The office was vacant from 20 October to 3 December 1976.
|-

|-
| style="text-align:center;" bgcolor=#EEEEEE colspan= 8| The office was vacant from 24 April to 15 May 1987.
|-

|-
| style="text-align:center;" bgcolor=#EEEEEE colspan= 8| The office was vacant from 19 March to 15 May 1992.
|-

|-
| style="text-align:center;" bgcolor=#EEEEEE colspan= 8| The office was vacant from 27 October to 1 November 1998.
|-

|-
| style="text-align:center;" bgcolor=#EEEEEE colspan= 8| The office was vacant from 7 April to 30 April 1999.
|-

See also
Politics of Germany

Notes

References

External links
 The Bundesrat - President and Presidium (Official Bundesrat website)
"Präsidenten des Bundesrates seit 1949" 
Official Bundesrat website (English).

Legislative branch of the Government of Germany
Lists of political office-holders in Germany
Bundesrat